Tehiya (Revival), originally known as Banai (Hebrew: , an acronym for Land of Israel Loyalists' Alliance), then Tehiya-Bnai, was an ultranationalist political party in Israel. The party existed from 1979 until 1992. In the eyes of many, Tehiya was identified with Geula Cohen, who founded the party and headed it throughout its existence.

Background

The party was formed in 1979 during the term of the ninth Knesset, when Geula Cohen and Moshe Shamir broke away from Herut in response to the Camp David Treaty between Egypt and Israel, particularly to the surrender of the Sinai peninsula to Egypt, and the eviction of its Israeli residents.

Tehiya was strongly affiliated with the extra-parliamentary movement of Gush Emunim, and included prominent members of Israeli settlements in the West Bank and Gaza such as Hanan Porat (later to be a member of the Knesset for the National Religious Party and the National Union) and Elyakim Haetzni. Another founder and prominent member was the physicist Yuval Neeman.

In its first electoral test, the 1981 legislative election, Tehiya picked up three seats. Despite their previous difference of opinion, they were included in Menachem Begin's coalition government alongside Likud, the National Religious Party, Agudat Israel, Tami and Telem. Although Cohen did not take a ministerial position, Neeman became Minister of Science and Development.

In the 1984 elections, Tehiya became the third largest party in the Knesset after the Alignment and Likud, albeit with only five seats. However, they refused to participate in the national unity government of Shimon Peres and Yitzhak Shamir, which included the Alignment, Likud, the National Religious Party, Agudat Israel, Shas, Morasha, Shinui and Ometz. During the Knesset session Rafael Eitan defected from Tehiya to found a new party, Tzomet.

The party was reduced to three seats in the 1988 legislative election, and was again excluded from Shamir's national unity government. However, when the Alignment left the coalition in 1990, Tehiya were invited into a new narrow right-wing government which included Likud, the National Religious Party, Shas, Agudat Israel, Degel HaTorah, the New Liberal Party. Although Cohen again declined a ministerial position, Neeman was appointed Minister of Energy and Infrastructure and Minister of Science and Technology. Despite its late entry to the government, the party pulled out of the coalition on 21 January 1992 in protest over Yitzhak Shamir's participation in the Madrid conference, which forced the government to hold new elections.

In the 1992 legislative election, the party failed to cross the electoral threshold, and subsequently disappeared, with Cohen joining Likud that year. It is likely that most of its electorate went to Eitan's Tzomet, who jumped from two seats in the 1988 elections to eight in the 1992 votes. The two parties had competed on the same secular right-wing electorate.

Tehiya fronted a number of controversial positions in its time, some of which were adopted by the mainstream; most notably, the Jerusalem Law, which was proposed by the party and enacted on 30 July 1980 establishing Jerusalem as the capital of the State of Israel.

Structure 
The structure of Tehiya was based on a military model due to Gideon Altshuler, former head of an IDF brigade being made Secretary General, and Shmuel Gordan a former Lieutenant Colonel being made head of organization. The party only allowed Jewish members.

Knesset members

Election platform

The Tehiya platform at the 1988 elections included:
 Jewish sovereignty over the Sinai, the West Bank and Gaza
 Increase of the number of Jews living in all quarters of the Old City of Jerusalem
 Strengthening of the IDF, including technical development and severe punishment for refusal to serve
 Support and increase for the settlements of the West Bank and Gaza, including establishment of a special police force
 Clemency for Jews convicted of crimes committed due to "security distress"
 Peace agreements only with Arab states who acquiesce to Jewish control over the entirety of the Land of Israel
 Jordan being the Palestinian State, all attempts to create a Palestinian state west of the Jordan River are to be prevented
 Cancellation of the access of Palestinians to the High Court of Justice
 Death penalty for severe cases of violence by Palestinians
 Licence for Israeli soldiers to shoot stone throwers
 Punishments of Palestinians to include collective punishments
 Wide access roads through the casbahs of Palestinian cities

References

External links
Tehiya-Bnai Knesset website
Tehiya Knesset website

Defunct political parties in Israel
Zionist political parties in Israel
Neo-Zionism
Revisionist Zionism
Political parties established in 1979
Far-right political parties in Israel
1979 establishments in Israel